In 2010 the U.S. Department of State reported that:
Eritrea is a source country for men, women, and children subjected to trafficking in persons, specifically conditions of forced labor and, to a lesser extent, forced prostitution. During the reporting period, acts of forced labor occurred in Eritrea, particularly in connection with the implementation of the country's national service program. Under the parameters set forth in Proclamation of National Service (No. 82/1995), men aged 18 to 54 and women aged 18 to 47 are required to provide 18 months of military and non-military public works and services in any location or capacity chosen by the government....

Eritrean children work in various economic sectors, including domestic service, street vending, small-scale factories, and agriculture; child laborers frequently suffer abuse from their employers and some may be subjected to conditions of forced labor. Some children in prostitution are likely exploited through third party involvement....

Each year, large numbers of Eritrean workers migrate in search of work, particularly to the Gulf States and Egypt, where some become victims of forced labor, primarily in domestic servitude. Smaller numbers are subjected to forced prostitution. In 2009, for example, five Eritrean trafficking victims were identified in the United Kingdom and one in Israel. In addition, thousands of Eritreans flee the country illegally, mostly to Sudan, Ethiopia, and Kenya, where their illegal status makes them vulnerable to situations of human trafficking.

In late 2013, the BBC reported the results of a study by activist Ms. Meron Estefanos and Dutch educators from Tilburg University. Among its conclusions: up to 30,000 Eritreans have been abducted since 2007—mostly refugees fleeing the country—and taken to Egypt's Sinai.   At least $600m (£366m) in ransom payments has been extorted. Nesru Jamal of ERTA said that the report, entitled "The Human Trafficking Cycle: Sinai and Beyond" was presented to EU home Affairs Commissioner Cecilia Malmström in the European Parliament on Dec. 4, 2013. Jamal says the report accuses Eritrea's Border Surveillance Unit (commanded by General Tekle Kiflay) of being central to the trafficking.

For years many abductions, blamed on Rashayida Bedouin, happened along the Sudan border. Physicians for Human Rights-Israel estimates that, between 2008 and 2012, as many as 4,000 refugees died.

U.S. State Department's Office to Monitor and Combat Trafficking in Persons placed the country in "Tier 3"  in 2017.

Background
The human rights record of Eritrea is considered poor. Since Eritrea's conflict with Ethiopia in 1998–2001, Eritrea's human rights record has worsened.  Several human rights violations are committed by the government or on behalf of the government. Freedom of speech, press, assembly, and association are limited. Those that practise "unregistered" religions, try to flee the nation, or escape military duty are arrested and put into prison.  Domestic and international human rights organizations are not allowed to function in Eritrea. In 2009 Human Rights Watch said that the government was turning the country into a 'giant prison'.

All denominations of Christianity enjoyed freedom of worship until 2002 when the government outlawed worship and assembly outside the 'registered' denominations. All groups who worship secretly in a house or any other unregistered place of assembly are arrested and imprisoned without charge or trial. Religious prisoners are often tortured in Eritrea. Freedom of worship is one of the top reasons thousands of Eritreans flee the country. There are thousands of Eritrean refugees in Ethiopia and Sudan seeking asylum in Europe or another region of the West. Eritrea is a one-party state in which national legislative elections have been repeatedly postponed.

Prosecution
U.S. Department of State, 2010:
Article 605 of the Eritrean Transitional Criminal Code prohibits trafficking in women and young persons for sexual exploitation, which is punishable by up to five years' imprisonment, or from three to 10 years' imprisonment if aggravating circumstances are present; these penalties are not commensurate with punishments prescribed for other serious crimes, such as rape. Article 565 prohibits enslavement and prescribes punishment of five to 20 years' imprisonment, penalties which are sufficiently stringent. Forced labor and slavery are prohibited, except where authorized by law under Article 16 of the ratified, but suspended, Eritrean Constitution. Proclamation 11/199 prohibits the recruitment of children under 18 years of age into the armed forces. Nevertheless, the government has never used these statutes to prosecute cases of human trafficking.

Protection
U.S. Department of State, 2010:
The government did not appear to provide any significant assistance to victims of trafficking during the reporting period. During the reporting period, the government reportedly operated a program to identify children involved in commercial sexual exploitation and reintegrate them with their families. The government did not make available information on the program's accomplishments in 2009. The Ministry of Labor and Human Welfare oversees the government's trafficking portfolio, but individual cases of transnational human trafficking are reportedly handled by the Eritrean embassy in the country of destination; information regarding embassy efforts to assist trafficking victims was not provided. The government has no known facilities dedicated to trafficking victims and does not provide funding or other forms of support to NGOs for services to trafficking victims.

Prevention
U.S. Department of State, 2010:
The government made no known efforts to prevent future incidences of trafficking during the reporting period. Eritrean media, all state-owned, made neither public announcements nor media presentations regarding human trafficking during the reporting period. There were no anti-trafficking education campaigns. The government reportedly warned students at Sawa military school and Mai Nefi, a local college, of the dangers of leaving the country, including the prospects of being sold into slave labor or sexual servitude. Although the government does not publicly acknowledge human trafficking as a problem, an office exists within the Ministry of Labor to handle labor cases, including human trafficking; the accomplishments of this office during 2009 are unknown.

See also
Refugee kidnappings in Sinai

References

Eritrea
Eritrea
Human rights abuses in Eritrea
Crime in Eritrea
Women's rights in Eritrea